The Philippine House Committee on Basic Education and Culture, or House Basic Education and Culture Committee is a standing committee of the Philippine House of Representatives.

Jurisdiction 
As prescribed by House Rules, the committee's jurisdiction includes the following:
 Alternative learning systems and community adult education
 Libraries and museums
 National language
 Pre-school, elementary and secondary education
 Preservation and enrichment of Filipino culture
 Science high schools except the Philippine Science High School System
 Teachers' and students' welfare

Members, 18th Congress

Historical members

18th Congress

Member for the Majority 
 Marissa Andaya (Camarines Sur–1st, NPC)

See also 
 House of Representatives of the Philippines
 List of Philippine House of Representatives committees
 Department of Education
 Culture of the Philippines

Notes

References

External links 
House of Representatives of the Philippines

Basic Education and Culture